Guang Ze Zun Wang, is a deity in Chinese folk beliefs. He has a unique image of crossing his right leg and dropping his left leg. He is a deified shepherd from Fujian Nan'an during the Five Dynasties and Ten Kingdoms period. His cult spread from Nan'an to the entire Minnan and to Taiwan, Hong Kong, and Southeast Asia with the migration of people from there. During the reign of the Guangxu Emperor, a detailed account of his life and cult was written.

Biography 

His birth name was Guo Zhongfu, a native of Quanzhou Nan'an, Fujian, born in the year of Tongguang in Later Tang, on the 22nd day of the 2nd lunar month, and his family lived at the foot of Guo Mountain for many generations. Guo Zhongfu was a very pious from childhood. He was working for the Yang family sheep herding in Qingxi (now Quanzhou Anxi) when he would suddenly miss his parents and run back home to Nan'an to serve them. After his father's death, Guo Zhongfu was always very sad when herding sheep because his family was poor and could not afford to buy land for burial. A geomancer felt that he was very filial and pointed out to him a piece of auspicious land. Guo then asked the Yang family to bury his father there and returned home to serve his mother.

There is also a folk legend that after Guo Zhongfu's father died early, his mother worked as a maid for the Yang family while Guo Zhongfu herded sheep for the Yang family. The Yang family hired a geomancer (said to be Cui Yun) to choose the location of the gravesite, but they accidentally neglected the geomancer. Guo Zhongfu's mother treated the geomancer with respect, so the geomancer asked her if her husband had been buried, and after learning that he had not, he asked her whether she wanted her descendants to be the "Emperor of China" or to enjoy "the title of marquis for ten thousand generations. "The mother chose the latter. The geomancer then told her: "Under the sheep pen is the feng shui perfect burial place (sheep shed centipede cave), you crush your husband's bones, and when you bring me breakfast tomorrow morning, you take the opportunity to scatter the ashes in the sheep pen, and then leave with your son, seeing a monk wearing a copper made bucket and bull riding a man, so he stopped. After Guo Zhongfu and his mother left Yang's house, they saw a monk with a bronze cymbal on his head to keep off the rain, and a shepherd boy hiding under the cow's belly to avoid the rain, so they chose to stay there.

One day, when he was sixteen years old, Guo Zhongfu, with a gourd and a Buddhist sutra in his hand, suddenly climbed to the top of Guo Mountain and sat on an ancient vine tree. When Guo Zhongfu's mother arrived, she reached out and pulled his left leg, so people who later made the statue portrayed him with his right leg up and his left leg down.

See also 

 Baosheng Dadi（Tong'an District）、Qingshui (monk)（Anxi County）、Mazu（Putian）
 Chinese folk religion、Taiwanese folk beliefs

References 

People from Anxi County
Deities in Taoism
Taoism in Taiwan
Deified Chinese people
Pages with unreviewed translations